Katrina Adams and Debbie Graham won in the final 6–3, 7–6 against Radka Bobková and Eva Melicharová.

Seeds
Champion seeds are indicated in bold text while text in italics indicates the round in which those seeds were eliminated.

 Katrina Adams /  Debbie Graham (champions)
 Petra Schwarz /  Katarína Studeníková (first round)
 Nanne Dahlman /  Clare Wood (quarterfinals)
 Anna Kournikova /  Petra Langrová (quarterfinals)

Draw

External links
 1996 Budapest Lotto Open Doubles Draw

Budapest Grand Prix
1996 WTA Tour